Megetra is a genus of blister beetles in the family Meloidae. There are at least three described species in Megetra.

Species
These three species belong to the genus Megetra:
 Megetra cancellata (Brandt & Erichson, 1832)
 Megetra punctata Selander, 1965
 Megetra vittata (LeConte, 1853)

References

Further reading

 
 
 

Meloidae
Articles created by Qbugbot
Tenebrionoidea genera